Għana is a type of traditional Maltese folk music. Għana has two literal meanings. The first is richness, wealth and prosperity; the second is associated with singing, verse, rhyme and even kantaliena, a type of singing with a slow rhythm. Għana can be broken up into formal and informal practices. The origin of the word is Arabic Ghena or Ghina غنى/غناء which means the same : richness or singing/songs/lyrics, etc.. . 

A singer in this field is locally called "Għannej" (literally 'the singer').

Informal Għana
Throughout its history, informal għana situations frequently occurred among both men and women. The informal sessions shed light on the importance of the music in day-to-day life of the Maltese. The very origins of għana can be traced back to early peasant farmers. Ciantar (2000), in his article 'From the Bar to the Stage' puts together the writings of a number of foreign and Maltese scholars who make the claim early għana instances represents both the "simple life of the Maltese peasant life", and the "intact natural environment of the island". Ciantar argues that the roots of għana are buried deep within traditional Maltese way of life, so much so that the two become synonymous with each other. Such a description by the scholar Aquilina (1931), for instance, emphasises this link between the people and għana:

How lovely it is, to hear from a remote and abandoned village amidst our island's hills, during a moonlit evening, while the cricket is hidden among the tomato plants, breaking the evening's silence, a handsome and healthy young man, swarthy as our country makes him, singing his għana ceaselessly. His soul would seemingly burst open with his singing! iantar argues that these songs evoke the very roots of Maltese poetry and literature, a claim that is also supported by 'Dun' Karm Psaila, Malta's national poet. In an article on the origin of Maltese poetry, Psaila goes on to link għana to the modest recreation and aspirations of the common people.

Both scholars, Aquilina and Psaila, place għana in the 'intact' natural environment of the island:

... one could listen to għana songs, accompanied by a guitar or an accordion, sung by men and women on sea coasts and during popular feasts such as Lapsi (Ascension Day). Youths used to sing għana love-songs in the open country, or the streets, or in houses during work-time even at bars such as "Viva iz-zejza".

Għana was a way to pass the time during hours of recreations and while completing household tasks. In particular, għana was practiced by the women singing on roof tops or in old communal wash houses, known as the għajn tal-ħasselin ("spring of the washers"). Wash houses were carved out of naturally forming caves around the island where water flows in a constant stream, providing a place to wash clothes. Like many other societies, men were the labourers and the women tended to the needs of the household. The women would converse with each other using rhyming song. It was a way of gossiping and passing time while they went about their household work. After washing, clothes were hung out to dry on the flat roofs typical of Maltese houses. From one roof it is easy to see – and indeed sing – across to neighbouring roofs over waist height fences. So essentially, there existed a pseudo community across the skyline of residential Malta, one in which women often took part in informal and unaccompanied għana sessions.

Formal Għana

There are 3 main types of għana: fil-Għoli, tal-Fatt and Spirtu Pront. Għana fil-Għoli is also known as Bormliża, taking its name from the city of Bormla where it was popular. Bormliża singing requires males to reach into extraordinarily high soprano ranges without breaking into falsetto. This style mimicked the early informal għana sung by women, but due to its extreme vocal demands, this style is very seldom practised. Għana tal-Fatt literally means 'fact' or 'actually happened'. This melancholic ballad style involves one għannej recounting a story about well known local identities, events or recent interesting or humorous, Maltese folktales and legends. Spirtu pront translates as 'quick wit', and originated from the informal 'song duels'. Other types of għana are: bil-Qamsa and Makjetta

Spirtu Pront

In Spirtu Pront sessions, two or more għannejja (singers) are paired together and take part in an improvised song duel that demonstrates their knowledge of a wide range of social topics as well as their command of the Maltese language. Sessions take around an hour in duration, and there may be a number of sessions that make up a whole performance. The għannejja are the living poets of the Maltese language, singing in a highly expressive, free flowing style. Their improvised melodic lines borrow heavily from Arabic influenced scales. Although improvisation is definitely an element, it is never the focus.

Once a session has commenced, għannejja must participate for the entire duration, and no new singer can join. The ghannejja usually begin with an introductory comment about who is taking part in the session. This section acts as a way of easing into the bout, but has more recently been used as a way of identifying participants during taped performances. The għannejja then begin discussing the topic. This would either be predetermined, or it will be established during the course of a session, just as a conversation would. Għana is not used to settle personal differences or arguments between singers. The song subjects themes themselves are dramatic and grave, even if dealt with wittily. They may be personal honour, reflections on social values, or political (in the narrow sense of the word) (Fsadni, 1993). Singers must display their superior knowledge in the topic, while adhering to a number of formal constraints. For instance, their improvised responses must rhyme, phrases should be in an 8, 7, 8, 7 syllabic structure, and singers must use 'high-flown' language. This form of language is not one that is used in ordinary social intercourse. It is highly elaborate making use of wit and double-entendre, and drawing on the many Maltese proverbs and idiomatic phrases. The Maltese language is a very ancient language, and compared to English, it does not contain many adjectives or adverbs. Instead, over the centuries, the Maltese have developed a rich and colourful library of proverbs to act as their descriptors. Occasionally, depending on the għannej, the language used is overtly self-righteous. Ultimately, this type of practice creates tension between competing għannejja. In most cases, the għannejja would be shaking hands with their opponent, similar to a sporting match, showing that what they are saying is only for entertainment and they do not mean to cause any offence.

The accompaniment is provided by three guitars usually strumming Western influenced tonic to dominant chordal progressions. This gives għana a very unusual sound, not quite Eastern, but not quite Western. In between sung verses, the next għannej (singer) is given time to prepare a respond to his opponents' remarks while the prim (first) guitar improvises melodies based on traditional għana melodies. The għana guitar is modelled on the Spanish guitar, and is described by Marcia Herndon as:

... a standard instrument, with metal frets and turning keys, metal strings, and traditional decorations on the front. It differs from the standard guitar only in that there are two sizes. The solo guitar is slightly smaller than the accompanying instruments. This, along with the method of tuning, indicates the presence in Malta of an older tradition of guitar playing which has almost died out elsewhere in the Mediterranean. The guitars are played with or without the use of a pick.

Prejjem

During spirtu pront, the "prim" begins improvising along a motive chosen from a 'restricted' repertory of Ghana motives. This section is known as the prejjem. These motives are popular, not only among the dilettante, but are well known outside of the għana community by the general Maltese public. The lead guitarist begins with an introductory section accompanied by the strumming of triadic, diatonic chords provided by the other guitarists. As soon as the former completes his improvisation he joins the other guitarists in the accompaniment based on the tonic and dominant of the established key. The function of this introductory section is to establish the tonality and tempo for the session. Tonality changes from one session to another in a whole performance, depending on what collectively suits the għannejja (singers). In the most frequently used 'La' accompaniment (akkumpanjament fuq il-La), the strings of the lead guitar will be tuned to E A d g b e' while those of the second accompanying guitars will be tuned a minor third lower, except for the bottom string: E F# B e g# c#'. The tone quality of these locally produced guitars is described by Ciantar (1997) as "very compact, with very low bass resonance". Such tuning is through to better facilitate the technical demands imposed on the lead guitarist in the creation of new motifs and variations. In the introductory section a series of rhythmic and intervallic structures are created and developed; this same rhythmic and melodic material is then reiterated in the second section by both the ghannejja and the lead guitarist. The frequent use of syncopation and descending melodic movements, for instance, form part of the formal structure of both the singing and instrumental soloing in the spirtu pront; these are structural elements announced in the introductory section as to establish the style of both Ghana singing and playing.

Famous Għana musicians

 Fredu Abela "il-Bamboċċu" (1944–2003)
 Mikiel Abela "il-Bambinu" (1920–1991)
 Leli Azzopardi "il-Bugazz" (1928–2003)
 Frans Baldacchino "il-Budaj" (1943–2006)
 Ġużeppi Camilleri "il-Jimmy tal-Fjur" (1917–1994)
 Salvu Darmanin "ir-Ruġel" (1905–1976)
 Pawlu Degabriele "il-Bies" (1908–1980)
 Grezzju Ellul "ta' Ċanċa" (1926–1996)
 Sam Farrugia "tal-Carabott" (1933–2002)
 Guzeppi Meli "Ta' Sika" (1929–2009)
 Żaru Mifsud "l-Għaxqi" (1933–2001)
 Żaren Mifsud "ta' Vestru" (1924–1999)
 Bastjan Micallef "Ir-Rabti" (1936–2002)
 Toni Pullicino "it-Tullier" (1927–1968)
 Rozina Sciberras "tat-Trott" (1880–1959)
 Fredu Spiteri "l-Everest" (1929–1965)
 Ġammari Spiteri "Amletu" (1907–1962)
 Leli Sultana "Il-Moni" (1921–2003)
 Karmnu Xuereb "In-Namru" (1911–1997)
 Pawlu Seychell "l-Għannej" (1907-1992)
 Ninu Galea "l-Kalora" (1922-2012)

References

External links
From the Bar to the Stage

Maltese folk music